Land and Freedom (or Tierra y Libertad) is a 1995 film directed by Ken Loach and written by Jim Allen. The film narrates the story of David Carr, an unemployed worker and member of the Communist Party of Great Britain, who decides to fight in the Spanish Civil War for the republicans, a coalition of Socialists, Communists and Anarchists against a nationalist coup d'etat. The film won the FIPRESCI International Critics Prize and the Prize of the Ecumenical Jury at the 1995 Cannes Film Festival. The film was also nominated for the Palme d'Or at Cannes.

Plot
The film's narrative unfolds in a long flashback. David Carr has died at an old age and his granddaughter discovers old letters, newspapers and other documents in his room: what we see in the film is what he had lived.

Carr, a young unemployed worker and member of the Communist Party, leaves Liverpool and travels to Spain to join the International Brigades. He crosses the Spanish border in Catalonia and coincidentally ends up enlisted in a POUM militia commanded by Lawrence, in the Aragon front. In this company, as in all POUM militias, men and women – such as the young and enthusiastic Maite – fight together. In the following weeks and months he becomes friends with other foreign volunteers, like the Frenchman, Bernard and the Irishman, Coogan and the latter's girlfriend Blanca – with whom David Carr later falls in love – also a member of POUM, and also the ideologue of his group.

After being wounded and recovering in a hospital in Barcelona, he finally joins – in accordance with his original plan and against the opinion of Blanca – the government-backed International Brigades, and he encounters the Soviet propaganda and repression against POUM members and anarchists; he then returns to his old company, only to see them rounded up by a government unit requiring their surrender: in a brief clash Blanca is killed. After her funeral he returns to Great Britain with a red neckerchief full of Spanish earth.

Finally the film returns to the present and we see Carr's funeral, in which his granddaughter throws the Spanish earth into his grave after speaking lines from "The Day Is Coming", a poem by William Morris.
Join in the battle wherein no man can fail,
For whoso fadeth and dieth, yet his deed shall still prevail.
Afterwards she performs a raised fist salute, honoring his beliefs.

Cast

Ian Hart – David Carr
Rosana Pastor – Blanca
Frédéric Pierrot – Bernard Goujon
Tom Gilroy – Lawrence
Icíar Bollaín – Maite
Marc Martínez – Juan Vidal
Andrés Aladren – Militia member
Sergi Calleja – Militia member
Raffaele Cantatore – Militia member
Pascal Demolon – Militia member
Paul Laverty – Militia member
Suzanne Maddock – Kim (David's granddaughter)

Themes
According to Ken Loach, the most important scene of the film is the debate in an assembly of a village successfully liberated by the militia. People from the actual village where the film was shot play peasant parts in the film and express their thoughts freely (despite language difficulties), and a debate ensues about whether or not to collectivize the village land and that of the recently shot priest. An American with the POUM militia argues that the war effort must come first, suggesting that collectivization and other revolutionary actions might hamper that effort. He mentions that if such actions and the slogans accompanying them continue, they will not gain the support of  powerful capitalist regimes such as the United States and Britain ("You're scaring them", he says). The necessity of a contemporaneous war and revolution is expressed by a German militiaman, who says that 'in Germany revolution was postponed and now Hitler is in power'. In the end the villagers vote for collectivization, thereby taking steps on a far-left path. In the anarchist and socialist controlled areas this kind of expropriation of land was common, as the civil war was accompanied by a social revolution.

As in the above scene, various languages: Spanish, English and Catalan are spoken throughout the film, and subtitles are used selectively. Carr arrives in Spain without knowing any Spanish, but gradually picks it up – and luckily for him English is the lingua franca in his militia.

The social revolution was opposed by both the Soviet-supported communists and the democratic republicans and as the war progressed, the government and the communists were able to leverage their access to Soviet arms to restore government control over the war effort, both through diplomacy and force. An historical event, the bloody fight between Republicans and Anarchists for controlling the Telefónica building in Barcelona, has been chosen by Loach as an emblem of this internal conflict (See Barcelona May Days). Carr's  disenchantment starts from this meaningless fight, which he fails to understand because both groups were supposed to be on the same side. At one point he is guarding the Communist Party headquarters in Barcelona and engages in banter across the barricades with the anarchists opposite. He asks a Mancunian among them "Why aren't you over here with us?" In reply his compatriot asks him the same question and Carr answers "I don't know".

Another important moment inspired by actual events is the execution of a village priest for acting in favor of the fascist side: he has broken the seal of confessions, telling the fascists where the anarchists were hiding and causing their deaths. The priest is also shown to have a bruised shoulder from firing a rifle.

Most critics and viewers noted the similarity between the story narrated in this film and George Orwell's book Homage to Catalonia, in which the author wrote one of the more famous accounts of the war, that of his own experience as a volunteer in the ILP Contingent, part of the POUM militia.

Soundtrack
A Las Barricades - Courtesy of Confederación de Nacional del Trabajo
La Internacional (1888) - Written by Pierre De Geyter
A Las Mujeres/"Ramona" (1928) - Music by Mabel Wayne - Lyrics by L. Wolfe Gilbert
Si me Quieres Escribir - Written by Juan Ignacio Cuadrado Bueno

Reception

Critical response

David Armstrong, cinema critic for The San Francisco Examiner, stated in SF Gate that "Veteran British director Ken Loach continues to toil in the fields of a now largely, and unjustly, eclipsed tradition: European social realism. Working in a near-documentary style that emphasizes the grit of everyday life, the cynical secretiveness of political leaders and the nobility of small people with big dreams, Loach makes feature films of uncommon gravity and integrity".

Philip French writing in The Observer said, "scripted by his regular collaborator, Jim Allen, Loach's movie is a visceral, emotional and intellectual experience, and among the finest films of the decade.".

See also
List of Spanish Civil War films

Awards and nominations

References

External links
 

 Film reviewed by Wilebaldo Solano, the former General Secretary of the POUM Youth, reprinted from Revolutionary History, Vol. 6, No. 2–3, pp. 275–6, summer 1996
A series of reviews including some hostile ones by Civil War veterans

1995 films
1990s war films
British war films
Spanish war films
1990s Spanish-language films
Catalan-language films
1990s English-language films
English-language Spanish films
Spanish Civil War films
Anarchism in Spain
Films about anti-fascism
Films about anarchism
Films about communism
Films set in Barcelona
Spanish multilingual films
British multilingual films
Best Foreign Film César Award winners
European Film Awards winners (films)
Films directed by Ken Loach
Films scored by George Fenton
Plays by Jim Allen
POUM
PolyGram Filmed Entertainment films
Gramercy Pictures films
1990s political films
1995 multilingual films
1990s British films
1990s Spanish films